"Declaration of War" is the second single from Hadouken!'s debut album released on 4 May 2008. , it is the band's second most successful single, after Liquid Lives, charting at #66 in the UK.

Track listing
7digital download
ecl# "Declaration of War" (Hadouken! vs. Kissy Sell Out Remix)
 "Declaration of War" (Mason Vocal Remix) 
 "Declaration of War" (The Whip Remix)
 "Declaration of War" (Jeuce Rework)

CD
 "Declaration of War"
 "Declaration of War" (Hadouken! Vs. Kissy Sell Out Remix)
# history of the"Declaration of War" (Mason Vocal Mix)
 "Declaration of War" (The Whip Remix)
 "Declaration of War" (Video)

Music video
The video for "Declaration of War" premiered on 25 March 2008, showing them getting chased through the city by people in black armour who kill the band members at the end of the video. It was later announced that the song would be a single, and that the video would begin screening at several locations around the country.

2008 singles
Hadouken! songs
2008 songs